Daniil Romanovich Chernyakov (born 7 January 2001) is a Russian football player. He plays for FC Fakel Voronezh.

Club career
He made his debut for FC Fakel Voronezh on 31 August 2022 in a Russian Cup game against FC Zenit Saint Petersburg. He made his Russian Premier League debut for Fakel on 22 October 2022 in a game against FC Rostov.

Career statistics

References

External links
 
 
 
 

2001 births
Living people
Russian footballers
Russia youth international footballers
Association football midfielders
FC Lokomotiv Moscow players
FC Fakel Voronezh players
Russian Second League players
Russian Premier League players